Charles River Laboratories International, Inc., is an American pharmaceutical company specializing in a variety of preclinical and clinical laboratory, gene therapy and cell therapy services for the Pharmaceutical, Medical device and Biotechnology industries. It also supplies assorted biomedical products, outsourcing services, and animals for research and development in the pharmaceutical industry (for example, contract research organization services) and offer support in the fields of basic research, drug discovery, safety and efficacy, clinical support, and manufacturing.

The company's broad portfolio allowed them to support the development of approximately 85% of FDA-approved drugs in 2018.

Its customers include leading pharmaceutical, biotechnology, agrochemical, government, and academic organization around the globe. The company has over 90 facilities, operates in 20 countries, and employs approximately 18,400 people worldwide.

Charles River Laboratories is often criticized by animal rights activists who condemn the company's usage of dogs and non-human primates for pharmaceutical purposes.

History
 Charles River was founded in 1947 by Henry Foster, a young veterinarian who purchased one thousand rat cages from a Virginia farm and set up a one-man laboratory in Boston, overlooking the Charles River. In an effort to fulfil the regional need for laboratory animal models, he bred, fed, and cared for the animals and personally delivered them to local researchers.

In 1955, the company's headquarters were relocated to their current home in Wilmington, Massachusetts. The organization became an international entity in 1966 with the opening of a new animal production facility in France.

The first commercial, comprehensive genetic monitoring program was implemented by Charles River in 1981. Three years later, they were acquired by Bausch & Lomb. During this time, Henry and Jim Foster are still in charge of the company.

In 1988, the organization started to expand their portfolio to include the creation of transgenic mice and rats. In the 1990s, Charles River expanded their portfolio further. They purchased Specific Pathogen Antigen Free Avian Services (SPAFAS) and serologic diagnostic services Merck, Sharp, and Dohme in 1992 and started offering in vitro endotoxin testing two years later.

Between 1996 and 2000, the company acquired Endosafe, Inc., was bought back from Bausch & Lomb by Jim Foster, acquired Sierra Biomedical, expanded its portfolio to offer biopharmaceutical services, and went public on the New York Stock Exchange. 

Charles River launched the Humane Care Imperative in 2002, designed to raise awareness and train their employees on the importance of animal welfare. The same year, they were named "Company of the Year" by The Boston Globe. The company then introduced preconditioning services in 2005 to provide their customers with study-ready animals.

In 2008, Charles River signed a ten-year contract to partner with the National Cancer Institute and opened a facility in Frederick, Maryland.

In April 2019, Charles River announced it will be ceasing its San Diego operations, moving the work to one of its sites in Northern California. In California, the company also has sites in the town of Hollister and in South San Francisco. The work done in San Diego—the breeding of rodents that scientists use to test compounds—was moved to Hollister, California.

The chairman and chief executive officer is James C. Foster, the son of founder Henry Foster.

In October 2021, a Japanese subsidiary of Charles River was acquired by Jackson Laboratory for $63M USD.

Acquisitions
In October 2003, Charles River Laboratories merged with Inveresk, a research company based in the United Kingdom. The company was known then as Charles River Laboratories. Inveresk specialised in clinical research and pre-clinical testing, and their main facilities are in Edinburgh, Scotland. In late 2009, Charles River sold its Clinical Services Division in Edinburgh to Quotient Bioresearch.

In 2010, Charles River Laboratories attempted to acquire WuXi PharmaTech, a China-based contract research organization, but the offer was withdrawn when the deal faced opposition from several large Charles River investors, including Relational Investors, JANA Partners, and Neuberger Berman. Proxy advisory firm RiskMetrics had also recommended that Charles River's shareholders vote against the proposed deal.

From 2008 to 2013, Charles River acquires several companies including NewLab Bioquality AG, MIR Preclinical Services, Piedmont Research Center, LLC, Cerebricon, Ltd., Accugenix, and Vital River, allowing the company to expand their research models and services portfolio to drug development and discovery markets in China.

The acquisitions of Argenta and BioFocus in 2014 allowed Charles River to establish themselves as a full-service, early-stage contract research organization with integrated in vitro and in vivo capabilities from target discovery through pre-clinical development.

In July 2015, the company announced it would acquire Celsis International for $212 million.

In January 2016, the company announced it was set to acquire WIL Research for approximately $585 million in cash. In June, the company announced it would acquire Blue Stream Laboratories.

In August 2017, the business announced it would acquire Brains On-Line.

In January 2018, the company announced it would acquire KWS BioTest for up to £18 million ($24.4 million). In February of the same year, Charles River announced it would acquire MPI Research for approximately $800 million in cash. The transaction was completed on April 3, 2018.

In February 2019, the company announced it would acquire Citoxlab for €448 million in cash (approximately $500 million), including the former acquisitions of the French company, AccelLAB, Atlanbio and Solvo Biotechnology. The transaction was completed on April 29. In December of the same year the business announced it would acquire HemaCare for approximately $380 million in cash.

In August 2020, the company announced it would acquire Cellero for $38 million in cash.

In January 2021, the company announced it would acquire Distributed Bio, Inc. an antibody discovery business. 

In February 2021, Charles River announced it would acquire Cognate BioServices, Inc. for $875 million. 

In March 2021, Charles River announced the acquisition of Retrogenix for $48 million. 

In May 2021, Charles River announced the acquisition of Vigene Biosciences, a gene therapy contract development and manufacturing organization (CDMO), for $292.5 million.

In April 2022, the company announced it would acquire Explora BioLabs.

In January 2023, the business announced it would acquire SAMDI Tech, Inc.

See also
 List of S&P 500 companies

Notes

External links

Companies listed on the New York Stock Exchange
Health care companies established in 1947
Companies based in Wilmington, Massachusetts
Multinational companies headquartered in the United States
Animal rights
Health care companies based in Massachusetts
Contract research organizations
Animal testing in the United States
Animal testing in the United Kingdom
1947 establishments in Massachusetts
Life sciences industry
2000 initial public offerings